Jeff Semple is a Canadian television journalist, currently a senior correspondent for Global National. 

Originally from Almonte, Ontario, he is a 2008 graduate of the journalism program at Ryerson University. He worked for CBC News from 2008 until 2015, when he joined Global News.

He is a two-time Canadian Screen Award nominee for Best National Reporter, receiving nods at the 9th Canadian Screen Awards in 2021 and at the 11th Canadian Screen Awards in 2023.

References

External links

21st-century Canadian journalists
Canadian television reporters and correspondents
People from Almonte, Ontario
Toronto Metropolitan University alumni
Living people